Girl Scout is a 2008 South Korean action comedy film directed by Kim Sang-man.

Plot 
Set in Bongcheon-3 dong, a deprived area in Seoul, four women are struggling financially. They are I-man (Na Moon-hee), a woman in her 60s working at a supermarket to look after her unemployed son; Bong-soon (Lee Kyung-sil), a widow who lives with an ill child; Mi-kyung (Kim Sun-a), a divorcee; and Eun-ji (Go Joon-hee), a caddie. They are determined to raise the money to open up a store in their neighborhood, and it is their sole hope and dream. But things get much worse when Hye-ran (Im Ji-eun), the head of their credit union, runs off with their life savings. Desperate, they create a team called Bong Chon Girl Scouts Troop #3 to recover the stolen money, and chaos ensues.

Cast 
 Kim Sun-a ... Choi Mi-kyung
 Na Moon-hee ... Lee I-man
 Lee Kyung-sil ... Oh Bong-soon
 Go Joon-hee ... Kang Eun-ji
 Park Won-sang ... Min Hong-gi
 Im Ji-eun ... Seong Hye-ran
 Ryu Tae-joon ... Lee Jong-dae
 Choi Jung-woo ... Director Han 
 Park Hyuk-kwon ... Beom-seok
 Kim Hyang-gi ... Yoon-i, Mi-kyeong's daughter
 Yeojin Jeon ... waitress
 Yang Gi-won ... Lee I-man's son
 Jeong Mi-seong ... supermarket manager
 Yeo Min-goo ... Han-seo Capital employee
 Jeong Se-hyeong ... security employee

Release 
Girl Scout was released in South Korea on June 5, 2008, after the postponement of its planned earlier release in April. On its opening weekend it was ranked fifth at the box office, grossing  and receiving 163,122 admissions. It eventually grossed , with total admissions at 249,114.

References

External links 
  
 
 
 

2008 films
2000s Korean-language films
South Korean action comedy films
Lotte Entertainment films
Myung Films films
2000s South Korean films